Cyaniris is a genus of butterflies in the family Lycaenidae.

Recent molecular studies have determined that Cyaniris is a different genus from Polyommatus, where it has been included for several years.

Species
Two species are recognized:

 Cyaniris semiargus (Rottemburg, 1775)
 Cyaniris bellis (Freyer, 1845)

References

Polyommatini
Lycaenidae genera